Braulio Rodríguez Plaza (27 January 1944) is a Spanish Catholic prelate, who was Metropolitan Archbishop of Toledo and Primate of Spain from 16 April 2009 to 27 December 2019. A bishop since 1987, he was Metropolitan Archbishop of Valladolid from 2002 to 2009.

Biography 
Rodríguez Plaza was born in Aldea del Fresno, Community of Madrid, which is now in the diocese of Getafe. He studied in the seminary in Madrid, obtaining a licentiate in theology at the Comillas Pontifical University.

He was ordained a priest on 3 April 1972 and was appointed as pastor of two rural parishes, vice parish priest in San Miguel de Carabanchel and then parish priest in San Fulgencio, a large parish in Madrid. He then became a formator at the major seminary in Madrid.

After two years in Jerusalem, he earned a degree in Sacred Scripture at the Biblical School. On 6 November 1987, Pope John Paul II appointed him Bishop of Osma-Soria. He received his episcopal consecration on 20 December 1987 from Archbishop Mario Tagliaferri.

He obtained a doctorate in Biblical Theology from the Faculty of Burgos. On 12 May 1995 he was transferred to the Diocese of Salamanca. On 28 August 2002 he was promoted to Metropolitan Archbishop of Valladolid. He received the pallium from Pope Benedict XVI on 29 June 2009.

On 16 April 2009, Pope Benedict named him Metropolitan Archbishop of Toledo, the oldest diocese in Spain, whose head is accorded the title Primate of Spain. In February 2010, Rodríguez Plaza dismissed a priest in the Toledo diocese as a result of accusations of prostitution. In January 2016, Rodríguez Plaza was misquoted as saying that women who suffered from domestic violence had often been disobedient to their husbands. Discussing the issue further in response to being misquoted, he said that domestic abuse is rooted in the lack of a real marriage, a fact he thought Spanish parties missed when trying to formulate political programs to address the problem of domestic violence.

Pope Francis accepted his resignation on 27 December 2019.

Within the Spanish Episcopal Conference, he was a member of the Standing Committee.

References

External links 

 Catholic Hierarchy: Archbishop Braulio Rodríguez Plaza

1944 births
Living people
People from the Community of Madrid
20th-century Roman Catholic archbishops in Spain
21st-century Roman Catholic archbishops in Spain
Archbishops of Toledo
Roman Catholic primates
Archbishops of Valladolid
Comillas Pontifical University alumni